WXXX (95.5 FM, "95 Triple X") is a radio station licensed to South Burlington, Vermont, and serving the Champlain Valley of Vermont and New York. On air and in advertisements the station is known as "95 Triple X." The station is owned by Sison Broadcasting, and it airs a contemporary hit radio/Top 40 format.  Studios and offices are on Mallets Bay Avenue in Colchester, Vermont.

History
From the 1950s into the late 1970s the WXXX call sign was assigned to an AM station at 1310 kHz in Hattiesburg, Mississippi.  (That station is no longer on the air.)

On November 16, 1984, WXXX (95 Triple-X) first signed on the air.  The first song was "Start Me Up" by The Rolling Stones.  WXXX was at first authorized by the Federal Communications Commission to operate at 3,000 watts on 95.3 MHz.  At that time it was owned by several well-known Vermont broadcasters including Howard Ginsberg, John Hughes and John Nichols.  They sold the station in 1986 to a Boston-based company.  It was subsequently sold again to Atlantic Ventures, another Boston-based firm.  After that it was purchased by the owners of 620 WVMT in Burlington, Vermont.  In the early 1990s WXXX upgraded its signal, increasing power to 25,000 watts and moving one notch up the dial to 95.5 MHz. Although the station is licensed to South Burlington, WXXX's offices and studios are located in Colchester along with co-owned WVMT. WXXX and WVMT were sold in October 2018 to Vox AM/FM LLC pending FCC approval; Vox began operating the stations under a local marketing agreement on January 1, 2019.  The next day, as part of some major lineup changes, 95 Triple X began carrying Elvis Duran and the Morning Show. It is worth noting that in 2005 Elvis Duran referenced the previous morning show for copying Phone Taps and using them as their own.

WXXX was the birthplace of many radio careers including Jonny Brooks, Lana Wilder, Jon "Jag" Gay, Mel Allen, Jonathan Channell, Michael Czarny, Michael Maze, Artie The One Man Party, Matthew "LA" Reid, Michael Mann, Troy Shannon, Keith Rice, Johnny "John Lucas" Grinnell, Scott Osbourne, Jeffrey Thomas, Lisa B., Joshua "J.B. Goode" Goodman,  Dena Yasner, Kenny Benson, Robert Dawes, Skipper Church, Walt Speck, Joe Taylor,"Mark In The Morning" Esbjerg, Rob Poulin and Kenan Guarino.

References

External links
WXXX - Official Website
Station info at Ontheradio.net

XXX
Contemporary hit radio stations in the United States
Radio stations established in 1984
1984 establishments in Vermont